The Bhima Pushkaram is the Pushkaram river festival organized on the banks of the Bhima river. It is a Hindu festival, organized once every 12 years. Thousands of people dive in to take a bath as worship. The Rashi or the Hindu zodiac sign for this river is Vrishchika or Scorpio.

References 

Festivals in India
Hindu festivals